In wireless communication, the term numerology refers to "waveform parametrization, e.g., cyclic prefix, subcarrier spacing." In contrast to the older use of the term for assigning interpretations with meaning to numbers, values and shapes, in wireless communication it assigns numbers to waveforms without mystic connotation.

Notes

References

Further reading
 Luo, Fa-Long; Zhang, Charlie Jianzhong (eds.) (2016). Signal Processing for 5G: Algorithms and Implementations.  United Kingdom: Wiley. 
 Osseiran, Afif; Monserrat, Jose F.; Marsch, Patrick (eds.) (2016). 5G Mobile and Wireless Communications Technology. United Kingdom: Cambridge University Press. 
 Schmidt, C., Cousseau, J., González, G., Gregorio, F. (2020). Signal Processing Techniques for Power Efficient Wireless Communication Systems: Practical Approaches for RF Impairments Reduction. Germany: Springer International Publishing. 

Wireless communication